Sandalwood is the common name of many species of plants and their wood and oils.

 The sandalwood family, Santalaceae, which includes:
 True sandalwoods, of the genus Santalum, particularly several commercially harvested species that provide sandalwood timber: 
 Santalum album, white or Indian sandalwood,  
 Santalum ellipticum, coast sandalwood 
 Santalum freycinetianum, Hawaiian sandalwood 
 Santalum lanceolatum, Northern sandalwood (also Northern sandalbox)
 Santalum spicatum, Australian sandalwood
Sandalwood oil, oil derived from Santalum album or Santulum spicatum

 Various unrelated plants with similarly-scented wood or oil:
 Adenanthera pavonina, sandalwood tree; red, false red sandalwood
 Baphia nitida, camwood, also known as African sandalwood 
 Eremophila mitchellii, sandalwood; false sandalwood (also sandalbox)
 Myoporum platycarpum, sandalwood; false sandalwood 
 Myoporum sandwicense, bastard sandalwood; false sandalwood
Osyris lanceolata, African sandalwood 
Osyris tenuifolia, east African sandalwood 
 Pterocarpus santalinus, red sandalwood

Other uses

 Kannada cinema, also known as Sandalwood cinema, films known as the cinema of Karnataka
 Sandalwood, a neighborhood of Jacksonville, Florida
 Sandalwood Heights Secondary School, a public high school in Brampton, Ontario, Canada
 Sandalwood High School, a public high school in Jacksonville, Florida
 Sandalwood Island, former name of Sumba
 Sandalwood Island, former name of Vanua Levu
 Sandalwood Pony, a horse from the Indonesian islands of Sumba and Sumbawa
 Sandalwood, South Australia, a town
 USS Sandalwood (AN-32), an Aloe-class net laying ship